Edge of Eternity may refer to:

Edge of Eternity (film), 1959 film starring Cornel Wilde
At the Edge of Eternity, 1990 album by Hexenhaus, with guitarist, producer and engineer Mike Wead
Edge of Eternity, 1994 novel by Jasmine Cresswell
Edge of Eternity (novel), 2014 novel by Ken Follett
Edge of Eternity (video game), 2021 video game

See also
Cosmic Codes: Hidden Messages From the Edge of Eternity, 1999 book by American evangelical Christian author Chuck Missler